This is a list of military operations in Europe on the Eastern Front of World War II. These were operations by Germany and its allies on one side and the Soviet Union and its allies on the other and were a consequence of the German invasion in 1941. The geographic boundaries have blurred edges. Finland, classed elsewhere as a "Nordic" country, participated in Barbarossa but later fought against German troops (see Military operations in Scandinavia and Iceland during World War II). Yugoslavia, for much of the war, was part of operations in southern Europe but it was liberated by the Red Army. In the cases of Finland and Yugoslavia, therefore, operations are likely to be entered in different lists, depending on the protagonists - not geography. Soviet operations in Iran will be listed in the List of World War II military operations.

Eastern Front

Axis
In alphabetic order
 Aktion 24 (1945)  — largely unsuccessful attempts to use Mistels and explosive-laden Do 24s to destroy strategic river bridges
 Aster (1944)  — withdrawal from Estonia.
 Barbarossa ("Red Beard" was the nickname for Emperor Frederick I) (1941)       — invasion of the Soviet Union.
 Haifisch ("Shark") (1941)  — deception operation for Barbarossa, feint on Scotland and north-east England from Norway.
 Harpune ("Harpoon") (1941)  — deception operation for Barbarossa, feint on southern England from France.
 München ("Munich") (1941)   — joint German-Romanian offensive of Bessarabia and Northern Bukovina.
 Taifun ("Typhoon") (1941)  — offensive to capture Moscow before winter.
 Beowulf I & II (Heroic figure) (1941)  — two separate plans to assault the Estonian islands of Saaremaa, Hiiumaa and Muhu
 Nordwind ("Northern wind") (1941)   — Diversionary plan for Beowulf II
 Lel (1941)  — sub-plan of Nordwind
 Nau (1941)  — sub-plan of Nordwind
 Stimmung ("Tendency") (1941)  — sub-plan of Nordwind
 Siegfried (Heroic figure)(1941)  — German assault on Hiiumaa
 Ost ("East") (1941)  — sub-plan of Siegfried
 Mitte ("Middle") (1941)  — sub-plan of Siegfried
 West (1941)  — sub-plan of Siegfried
 Südwind ("Southern wind") (1941)  — Diversionary plan for Beowulf II
 Weststurm ("Western Storm") (1941)  — naval bombardment in support of Beowulf II
 Westwind (1941)  — Diversionary plan for Beowulf II
 Edelweiss (1942)  — advance through the Caucasus to the Baku oil fields and Black Sea coast
 Kreml ("Kremlin") (1942)  — deception operation to conceal southern offensive
 BLAU ("BLUE") (1942)  — Umbrella name for drive towards southern Soviet Union.
 Blücher ("after Gebhard Leberecht von Blücher") (1942)   — campaign into the Caucasus
 Braunschweig  ("Brunswick") (1942)  — drive towards Stalingrad and the Caucasus.
 Fischreiher ("Heron") (1942)  — offensive to capture Stalingrad.
 Hubertus (1942)  — attack against Stalingrad
 Wintergewitter ("Winter Storm") (1942)   — attempt to relieve encircled 6th Army at Stalingrad by Army Group Don.
 Donnerschlag ("Thunderclap") (1942)  — planned breakout of the Sixth Army.
 Dietrich (1942)  — planned counter-attack to relieve Sixth Army using SS panzer divisions Grossdeutschland & Leibstandarte Adolf Hitler. Unimplemented.
 Delphin ("Dolphin") (1943)  — German withdrawal from Saaremaa, Estonia.
 Eisenhammer ("Iron Hammer") (1943)  — abandoned plan to attack Soviet power plants power generators near Moscow and Gorky, using Mistel composite aircraft, abandoned in 1945.
 Eisstoss ("Ice Push") (1941)  — Luftwaffe raids on Soviet warships near Leningrad including;
 Froschlaich ("FrogSpawn") (1941) - air raids against Soviet Navy yards at Leningrad, USSR; part of Operation Eisstoss
 Götz v. Berlichingen (a knight in the Swabian war) (1941) - air raids against Soviet Navy at Leningrad, USSR; part of Operation Eisstoss
 Feuerzauber ("Fire Magic") (1942)  — planned capture of Leningrad
 Flamingo (1942)  — planting of Mishinskii as German agent in Soviet military hierarchy
 Frühlingserwachen ("Spring Awakening") (1945)   — counterattack against Soviets in Hungary. Last major offensive on Eastern Front.
 Hannibal (1945)  — evacuation of East Prussia
 Joseph (1944)  — proposal to destroy electricity supplies to Moscow
 Konrad (1945)   — German-Hungarian efforts to relieve the encircled garrison in Budapest
 Laura (1944)  — proposed evacuation of Courland
 Margarethe (1944)  — military operation to keep Hungary from defecting
 Narwa I II III (1942/43)  — sabotage operations behind Soviet lines
 Nordlicht ("Northern Lights") (1942)  — planned assault on Leningrad — 
 Polikov (1942/43)  — sabotage operations behind Soviet lines
 Rennstrecke (1944)  — planned air supply of German troops isolated behind Soviet lines (later found out as a Soviet deception)
 Salzsee (1944)  — sabotage operations in Kalmykia, USSR
 Schamil (1942)  —
 Sonnenwende ("Winter Solstice") (1945)  — offensive in Pomerania to stall the advance on Berlin
 Südwind ("South Wind") (1945)  — offensive in Hungary to eliminate the Soviet bridgehead west of the Garam
 Trappenjagd ("Bustard Hunt") (1942)    — offensive in the Kerch Peninsula
 Wilddieb (1944)  — RSHA operation to monitor radio traffic from isolated German troops
 Wolf (1942/43)  — sabotage operations behind Soviet lines
 Wunderland ("Wonderland") (1942)  — 
 Zauberflöte (1943)  — Joint Wehrmacht / SS Police security operation in Minsk, Belarus
 Zitadelle ("Citadel") (1943)  — German offensive at Kursk

Soviet Union
Operations listed here are some of the better known strategic operations of the Red Army in World War II, and exclude operations by partisans or "Home Armies". These are included under List of World War II military operations.
Names of other operations have not been recorded and these have become known by their regional objective.

In alphabetic order
 Bagration (1944)  — successful large-scale offensive in Belorussia.
 Belgrade Offensive (1944)  — successful offensive to disrupt the German occupation of Yugoslavia and seize Belgrade.
 Battle of Berlin (1945)  — successful offensive to take Berlin.
 Bratislava–Brno Offensive (1945)  — successful offensive to take Bratislava and Brno.
 Budapest Offensive (1944) & (1945)  — successful offensive to take Budapest.
 Iskra ("Spark") (1943)  — successful Soviet counter-offensive around Leningrad
 Jassy–Kishinev Offensive (August 1944)  — successful offensive causing Romania to switch allegiance to the Allies.
 Kutuzov (1943)  — attack on 2nd Panzer Army, in Orel region north of the Kursk salient
 Lyuban (1942)  — failed attempt to relieve Leningrad.
 Mars (1942)  — failed major offensive against Rzhev salient
 Jupiter (1942)  — second phase of failed major offensive against Rzhev salient.
 Polar Star (1943)  — offensive to destroy Army Group North.
Polkovodets Rumyantsev (1943)  — defeat of Army Group South's 4th Panzer Army and Army Detachment Kempf.
 Prague Offensive (1945)  — Soviet offensive in final stages of World War II
Operation Ring (1943)  — Destruction of the encircled army at Stalingrad.
Samland (1945)  — capture of Königsberg.
Saturn (1942)  — Proposed major attack following the Stalingrad encirclement; revised to Little Saturn.
 Sinyavino (1941) & (1942)  — separate failed Soviet attempts to relieve Leningrad
 Suvorov (1943)  — recapture of Spas-Demensk, El’nia, Roslavl’, and Smolensk.
 Uranus (1942)  — successful Soviet encirclement of German Sixth Army in Stalingrad.
 Vienna Offensive (1945)  — successful offensive to take Vienna.
 Vistula–Oder Offensive (1945)  — successful offensive in Poland and Germany from the Vistula to the Oder.

See also
 List of World War II military operations
 Operation Unthinkable
 Strategic operations of the Red Army in World War II

Notes and references

Operations

ca:Operacions de la Segona Guerra Mundial#Front Oriental